L-371,257 is a compound used in scientific research which acts as a selective antagonist of the oxytocin receptor with over 800x selectivity over the related vasopressin receptors. It was one of the first non-peptide oxytocin antagonists developed, and has good oral bioavailability, but poor penetration of the blood–brain barrier, which gives it good peripheral selectivity with few central side effects. Potential applications are likely to be in the treatment of premature labour.

See also 
 Atosiban
 Barusiban
 Epelsiban
 L-368,899
 Retosiban

References 

Tocolytics
Oxytocin receptor antagonists
Peripherally selective drugs